Triples is an Indian Tamil-language romantic comedy streaming television series for Hotstar Specials produced by Karthik Subbaraj under his Stone Bench Creations, with the script being written by Balaji Jayaraman and directed by Charukesh Sekar. The series stars Jai and Vani Bhojan in the lead role. while Rajkumar, Vivek Prasanna, Madhuri Jain and Namita Krishnamurthy in the supporting role. It was released through Disney+ Hotstar on 11 December 2020.

Plot 
Three friends set out to Goa to deal with a major problem that threatens to ruin their business, and lives. A loan shark, a politician who is on the lookout for his daughter, an ex-wife and a current girlfriend make their journey adventurous.

Cast

Episodes

Production

Producer Karthik Subbaraj and director Charukesh Sekar noted that the show was written to match Crazy Mohan's style of writing, stating that "Growing up, we have all been fans of Crazy Mohan sir. When I was pitched the idea, I thought it was funny and interesting because it had good humour and romance quotient as well". Two of the characters in the show —  Vivek Prasanna and Rajkumar — were named as Madhu and Cheenu, a reference to Mohan's theatre sketches. Charukesh stated that the two characters are Mohan's iconic creations, further adding that "When the show's writer (Balaji) narrated these characters to me, I was sold. The show plays out like a comedy of errors and has lots of wordplay, just like in the style of Crazy Mohan".

Soundtrack 

The soundtrack album is composed by Vishal Chandrashekhar and Jai, with the former also working in the production of the film's music and background score. The series feature two songs which were released individually on 4 December 2020. The series mark Jai's debut as a composer, who worked in one song from the album.

Release 
On 23 October 2020, Disney+ Hotstar announced four Tamil original web series for Hotstar Specials with Triples being one of them, and its teaser was released as a part of the promotional purposes the same day. The official trailer was released on 30 November 2020. The series released through Disney+ Hotstar on 11 December 2020 in Tamil along with Telugu, Malayalam, Marathi, Kannada, Bengali and Hindi dubbed languages.

Reception
V. Lakshmi of The Times of India gave 3 out of 5 and stated "Triples does manage to take you on a joyful, yet bumpy ride, despite its hurried writing and a few rutted sequences notwithstanding." Srinivasa Ramanujam of The Hindu wrote "Triples’ arrives at a time when there's a lot of comedy options for the average Tamil viewer. There are Vadivelu/Vivek scenes galore to re-visit, and other recent aspiring players who are creating quite a mark in the online space. That it manages to leave a mark despite all that means something, and that surely augurs well for the larger Tamil comic space." Behindwoods gave 2.5 out of 5 and stated "Despite the humour working only in parts, Triples is a watchable web-series."

Manoj Kumar R. of The Indian Express gave a mixed review writing "We get the Crazy Mohan-style comedy only in terms of names of the characters. There aren't enough clever wordplays, puns and laugh-out-loud moments to encourage us to overlook other problems."

Ranjani Krishnakumar of Firstpost panned the show stating "The biggest shame with Triples is that it had potential. A sharper commentary on the world and a cleverer dialogue writer could have made Triples an absolute delight of a show." Sudhir Srinivasan of Cinema Express gave a rating of 1.5 out of 5 and wrote "This web-series never amounts to anything more than mundane chatter between cardboard characters."

References

External links
 

Tamil-language web series
Tamil-language Disney+ Hotstar original programming
Tamil-language romantic comedy television series
2020 Tamil-language television series debuts
2020 Tamil-language television series endings